Die! Die! Die! is the debut EP by New Zealand trio Die! Die! Die!. 

It was recorded by Dale Cotton on 15 November 2004 at Platform Studios in Auckland, NZ.

It was released on March 23 2005 on Unstable Ape Records in Australia and New Zealand.

Track listing
Ashtray! Ashtray! - 2:46
Made Up In Red - 1:06
Auckland is Burning - 2:36
Shyness Will Get You Nowhere - 2:02
Rat - 1:21
Brat - 4:00

2005 debut EPs
Die! Die! Die! albums